Mulga to Mangoes is the eleventh studio album by Australian country music artist John Williamson. The album was released in August 1994 and peaked at number 14 on the ARIA Charts and was certified gold.

At the Country Music Awards of Australia in January 1996, the album won 'Top Selling Album'.

Track listing

Charts

Year-end charts

Certifications

Release history

References

1994 albums
John Williamson (singer) albums
EMI Records albums